= Coldspring Mountain =

Mountain in Yukon, Canada

Coordinates: 63°02′17″N 137°13′15″W

Coldspring Mountain is a mountain located in Yukon, Canada.
